The 1943 NFL Championship Game was the 11th annual title game of the National Football League (NFL), held at Wrigley Field in Chicago on December 26 with an attendance of 34,320. In a rematch of the previous year's game, the Western Division champion Chicago Bears (8–1–1) met the Eastern Division champion Washington Redskins (6–3–1). The previous week, the Redskins had defeated the New York Giants at the Polo Grounds in a playoff game by a score of 28–0 to determine the champs of the east, after the teams ended the regular season with identical records. The Redskins had dropped their final three regular season games, including two to the Giants. Even though the Giants had swept the season series with Washington, the rules of the time called for a tiebreaker game (division tiebreaker games were eliminated in 1967 with the development of divisional tiebreaking rules).

The divisional playoff game pushed the championship game back to its latest ever date, and the late-December Chicago weather caused the game to be dubbed the "Ice Bowl." The Bears were favored by a touchdown, and won by twenty points, 41–21. The crowd was smaller than the previous year's and well off the championship game record of 48,120 set in 1938, but the gross gate receipts of $120,500 set a record. In addition to the gate, radio broadcast rights to the game were sold for $5,000.

The Bears were led by quarterback Sid Luckman while Sammy Baugh was the quarterback for the Redskins. The Redskins were coached by Dutch Bergman.

Rosters

Starters

Substitutions
Bears substitutions: Pool, Berry, Steinkemper, Babartsky, Mundee, Ippolito, Logan, Matuza, McLean, Luckman, Famighetti, Nagurski, McEnulty, Nolting and Vodicka.

Redskins substitutions: Piasecky, Lapka, Wilkin, Zeno, Fiorentino, Leon, Hayden, Baugh, Seymour, Moore, Gibson, Akins and Stasica.

Officials
Referee: Ronald Gibbs
Umpire: John Kelly
Head Linesman: Charlie Berry
Field Judge: Eddie Tryon 

Scoring summary
Sunday, December 26, 1943
Kickoff: 2 p.m. CWT (CDT)

First quarter
no scoring
Second quarter
WAS – Andy Farkas 1 yard run (Bob Masterson kick), 7–0 WAS
CHI   – Harry Clarke 31 yard pass from Sid Luckman (Bob Snyder kick), 7–7 tie
CHI   – Bronko Nagurski 3 yard run (Snyder kick), 14–7 CHI
Third quarter
CHI   – Dante Magnani 36 yard pass from Luckman (Snyder kick), 21–7 CHI
CHI   – Magnani 66 yard pass from Luckman (kick failed), 27–7 CHI
WAS – Farkas 17 yard pass from Sammy Baugh (Masterson kick), 27–14 CHI
Fourth quarter
CHI   – Jim Benton 26 yard pass from Luckman (Snyder kick), 34–14 CHI
CHI   – Clarke 10 yard pass from Luckman (Snyder kick), 41–14 CHI
WAS – Joe Aguirre 25 yard pass from Baugh (Aguirre kick), 41–21 CHI

Game statistics

Players' shares
Each player on the Bears took home $1,135 while each member of the Redskins got $754.

References

Champ
1943 NFL Championship Game
Chicago Bears postseason
Washington Redskins postseason
NFL Championship
December 1943 sports events
1940s in Chicago
Sports competitions in Chicago
American football in Chicago